The following is a list of notable sanatoria (singular: sanatorium) in the United States. Sanatoria were medical facilities that specialized in treatment for long-term illnesses. Many sanatoria in the United States specialized in treatment of tuberculosis in the twentieth century prior to the discovery of antibiotics.

List

See also
History of tuberculosis

References

Sanatoria
 
History of medicine in the United States